Harlock is a surname. Notable people with the surname include:

David Harlock (born 1971), Canadian ice hockey player
Des Harlock (1922–1981), Welsh footballer
Kenny Harlock, New Zealand footballer
Neil Harlock (born 1975), New Zealand footballer
Captain Harlock, fictional character created by Leiji Matsumoto
Harlock: Space Pirate, film based on the character